The 1985 season was São Paulo's 56th season since club's existence.

Statistics

Scorers

Overall 
{|class="wikitable"
|-
|Games played || 71 (20 Campeonato Brasileiro, 42 Campeonato Paulista, 9 Friendly match)
|-
|Games won || 35 (7 Campeonato Brasileiro, 23 Campeonato Paulista, 5 Friendly match)
|-
|Games drawn || 21 (6 Campeonato Brasileiro, 12 Campeonato Paulista, 2 Friendly match)
|-
|Games lost || 16 (7 Campeonato Brasileiro, 7 Campeonato Paulista, 2 Friendly match)
|-
|Goals scored || 121
|-
|Goals conceded || 74
|-
|Goal difference || +47
|-
|Best result || 5–0 (H) v São Bento - Campeonato Paulista - 1985.07.31
|-
|Worst result || 2–4 (A) v Atlético Mineiro - Campeonato Brasileiro - 1985.02.10
|-
|Top scorer || Careca (35)
|-

Friendlies

Torneio Triangular LuIz Henrique Rosas

Official competitions

Campeonato Brasileiro

First round

Matches

Second round

Matches

Record

Campeonato Paulista

First phase

Second phase

Matches

Final standings

Semifinals

Finals

Record

External links
official website 

Association football clubs 1985 season
1985
1985 in Brazilian football